Logan Campbell (born 23 May 1971) is a former Scotland international rugby league footballer who played as a professional in Australia and England. He also represented Auckland.

Background
He was born in New Zealand.

Early years
A Northcote Tigers junior, in 1991 Campbell won the Tetley Trophy, topping the try scoring charts in Auckland Rugby League's Fox Memorial Trophy. During this time Campbell also represented Auckland.

Playing career
Campbell played for the Newcastle Knights in 1993. Even though he only played one game for the Newcastle Knights, he is famous with older fans for debuting on the bench with the then 19-year-old Andrew Johns.

In early 1994 he joined the London Crusaders. In 1996 he joined Workington Town in the new Super League competition. He joined Hull F.C. in 1997 for three seasons before spending 2000 with the Castleford Tigers (Heritage № 763). In 2001 he returned to Hull for another season before being released.

Representative career
Campbell played two matches for Scotland in 1998. He was selected for the 2000 World Cup for Scotland but never played in a match.

References

External links
Statistics at thecastlefordtigers.co.uk

1971 births
Living people
Auckland rugby league team players
Castleford Tigers players
Hull F.C. players
London Broncos players
New Zealand rugby league players
Newcastle Knights players
Northcote Tigers players
Rugby league centres
Rugby league second-rows
Scotland national rugby league team players
Workington Town players